Wolverine Wildcat is a wooden roller coaster at Michigan's Adventure, an amusement park near Muskegon, Michigan. It first opened in 1988 before Cedar Fair purchased the park. It is located in Timbertown, near the Timbertown Railway Station. It was the commonly referred to as the most thrilling ride at Michigan's Adventure until Shivering Timbers was built in 1998. The ride has a double out and back layout that is loosely based on the former Wildcat at  Coney Island. Wolverine Wildcat celebrated its 30th year at Michigan's Adventure in 2018, which was also Shivering Timbers' 20th anniversary and Thunderhawk's 10th anniversary.

Although various amusement rides and other coasters had been added to the park, the introduction of this coaster signaled a move into the big leagues along with a name change from Deer Park Funland to Michigan's Adventure. The coaster was designed by Curtis D. Summers and built by the Dinn Corporation. It was the first new project for the duo Dinn & Summers, who would go on to build an additional nine coasters over the next four years.

The coaster is now mainly worked on by Martin & Vleminckx through multiple reconstruction and retracking projects in order to smoothen it out and give a better total ride experience.

References

External links

Official page

Roller coasters in Michigan
Roller coasters introduced in 1988
Michigan's Adventure
Roller coasters operated by Cedar Fair